John Gordon Mein (September 10, 1913 – August 28, 1968) was the first United States ambassador to be assassinated while serving in office.

Mein served as the United States Ambassador to Guatemala during the Guatemalan Civil War. It was during his tenure that U.S.-backed state terrorism which started after the 1954 Guatemalan coup d'état greatly accelerated with forced disappearances and massacres. He was shot by rebels belonging to the Rebel Armed Forces (FAR) one block from the U.S. consulate on Avenida Reforma in Guatemala City on August 28, 1968. U.S. officials believed that FAR intended to kidnap him in order to negotiate an exchange, but instead they shot him when he attempted to escape. The rebels had killed two U.S. military aides prior to the assassination of Mein.

He is buried at Rock Creek Cemetery, in Washington, D.C.

See also
Ambassadors of the United States killed in office

References

External links
Foreign Service Life
 The Political Graveyard

1913 births
1968 deaths
Ambassadors of the United States to Guatemala
Terrorism deaths in Guatemala
Assassinated American diplomats
American terrorism victims
American people murdered abroad
People murdered in Guatemala
Burials at Rock Creek Cemetery
Deaths by firearm in Guatemala